Maria "Frica" Tudela Pangelinan (born December 5, 1948) is a Northern Mariana Islander politician. She is the first female senator to serve in the Northern Mariana Islands Senate.

She graduated from the University of Guam in 1981 with a BBA. While attending college, she served as acting director of finance. She was elected as a delegate to the CNMI's second constitutional convention.

Pangelinan is a member of the Democratic Party of the Northern Mariana Islands. In the 2018 Northern Mariana Islands gubernatorial election, Pangelinan endorsed Republican incumbent Ralph Torres.

References

External links
Saipan Tribune: Senator Pangelinan Farewell letter published in the Saipan Tribune
Senator Maria Frica T. Pangelinan official biography

1948 births
Living people
Democratic Party (Northern Mariana Islands) politicians
Northern Mariana Islands women in politics
Northern Mariana Islands Senators
21st-century American women